The AK-12 is a Russian assault rifle chambered in 5.45×39mm designed and manufactured by the Kalashnikov Concern (formerly Izhmash), making it the fifth generation of Kalashnikov rifles.

The Kalashnikov Concern also offers a variant of the AK-12 chambered in 7.62×39mm, known as the AK-15 due to the request of the Russian military. A variant chambered in 5.56×45mm NATO was later unveiled, known as the AK-19 upon the request of international clients. Compact variants of the AK-12 and AK-15 are also under development, respectively the AK-12K and AK-15K, which feature a shorter barrel.

The AK-12 project began in 2011 by the IZHMASH factory, which became part of the Kalashnikov Concern as a private venture, in an attempt to participate in the "Ratnik" trials which were held by the Russian army. It was further developed by the Kalashnikov Concern, throughout its development and evaluation stage it has received multiple modifications to meet the Russian military's standard and to address the Russian army's concerns regarding the cost and issues in fully automatic fire of the earlier prototype models. It went through several revisions in order to improve upon the "range of defects" that were discovered on the earlier prototype models that were derived from the AK-200. These were later abandoned in favour of the proven and improved AK-400, which became the finalised model of the AK-12.

History
On 25 May 2010, the Russian media published a Russian Ministry of Defence statement that the AK-12 rifle was to be tested in 2011. An early prototype model, the AK-200), was presented to the Russian Prime Minister Vladimir Putin during his official visit to inspect the products of the Izhmash arms manufacturing plant in Izhevsk. It was apparently a basic AK-74, thus chambered in 5.45×39mm cartridge. The prototype was fitted with a large-capacity 60-round casket magazine. On the early prototype model, the traditional locations of the cocking handle, safety lever, and fire selector remained unchanged, but the AK-12's production model featured revisions to all of these features.

On 16 September 2013, the Deputy Chairman of the Military-Industrial Commission of Russia said the Russian Army would start receiving AK-12 assault rifles chambered in 5.45 mm and 7.62 mm in 2014. The new rifle would be put into service along with the new handguns, machine guns and sniper rifles. The AK-12 basic platform allows for nearly 20 different modifications to change into other configurations. State trials were to begin in fall 2013. However, on 23 September 2013, the Izvestiya tabloid wrote that, according to an anonymous source, the AK-12 will not be adopted or even undergo state tests due to shortcomings in preliminary tests. The AK-12 was to replace three previous of AK models and standardise assault rifles in the Russian military. The government's rejection of the AK-12 was because senior commanders said they had millions of stockpiled AK-74 models and did not need a new rifle. However, trials would continue for law enforcement agencies.

However, on 23 December 2014, the Russian Army announced that the AK-12, as well as the KORD 6P67, had passed state trials and would be accepted into service with operational units for evaluation. It was expected that both weapons would begin being trialled operationally by Russian forces by March 2015.

On 6 September 2016, it was reported that Kalashnikov Concern introduced the final production model of the AK-12, which is derived from the well proven AK-400 (Base Prototype) and has replaced the earlier prototype models. There were two base models that were introduced, the AK-12 which is chambered in 5.45×39mm cartridge and the AK-15 which is chambered in 7.62×39mm cartridge. Kalashnikov Concern also introduced a new squad automatic weapon that is chambered in 5.45×39mm cartridge, the RPK-16 which is based on the traditional Kalashnikov layout and design and has several novel technical and ergonomic features derived from the AK-12 program. It was also reported that the final production model of the AK-12 and AK-15 began participating in troop trials with the Russian Army, where it competed against the Degtyarov KORD 6P67 and KORD 6P68 balanced action assault rifles. The AK-12 completed its operational testing and passed military field tests in June 2017. Both AK-12 and AK-15 completed testing in December 2017. In January 2018 it was announced that the AK-12 and AK-15 have been adopted by the Russian military.

Prior to the United States sectoral sanctions against the Russian arms industry in July 2014, the United States civilian weapons market accounted for 90% of the Kalashnikov Concern civilian weapons sales. In 2014, Kalashnikov Concern planned to sell 200,000 Russian manufactured weapons in the United States market through its sole US distributor, the RWC Group. The sales of Russian manufactured Kalashnikovs to the United States significantly reduced both the production costs of current Kalashnikov weapons and the development costs of future Kalashnikov models that the Russian government purchases.

Testing of the AK-12 concluded in December 2017, with the weapon being adopted by the Russian Army in January 2018.

In August 2018, the Armenian Ministry of Defence announced that they had secured the rights to manufacture the AK-12 and AK-15 in Armenia.

The rifle's first confirmed use in a conflict was during the 2022 Russian invasion of Ukraine by some units of Russian forces. Ukrainian forces have captured a few AK-12s, in addition to limited usage by members of the Territorial Defense Forces.

Design

Early prototype model based on the AK-200 

The cancelled prototype model, based on the AK-200, uses the same gas-operated long-stroke piston system of the previous Kalashnikov rifles, but many features are radically different from the other rifles in its family. The light version has the ability to change calibres by swapping the barrels. It is chambered in 5.45×39mm cartridge as for the standard configuration and can be either changed to the 7.62×39mm or 5.56×45mm NATO cartridge. Other intermediate calibres are also expected. The heavy version will chamber the larger 7.62×51mm NATO cartridge. It is fed through the standard AK-74M 30-round magazines and can also accept the 45-round magazines from the RPK-74. The 7.62×39mm Soviet-chambered version is compatible with the AKM's 30-round magazine and RPK's 40-round box magazine and 75-round drum magazines. The magazines specifically for the cancelled prototype model of the AK-12 includes a 30-round magazine with a bolt-catch actuator, a 60-round quad-stack magazine and a 95-round drum.

The cancelled prototype model of the AK-12 is very different from its predecessors ergonomically. It features a telescoping buttstock that is in-line with the barrel for better recoil control and a stock latch, allowing for it to be folded to either side of the rifle. It has a rubber height-adjustable cheek piece and butt plate. The cocking handle is moved forward and can be attached to both sides for ambidextrous use. The receiver is hinged and more rigid with a Picatinny rail for mounting optics. There are several other accessory rails on the weapon, including on both sides, on the bottom and on the top of the handguard (in-line with the receiver for a longer monolithic rail), and on top of the gas block. There is also a lug under the gas chamber that can mount a GP-34 grenade launcher and another one under the front sight holder mounts a bayonet. The rear iron sight is further back on the receiver and can be set for aiming when the stock is extended or folded. The magazine release is in the same position but can be used by the trigger finger to detach magazines. In a departure from previous AK-type rifles, the dust cover safety selector has been replaced with an ambidextrous fire selector; it has four positions safe, semi-automatic, three-round burst fire and fully automatic fire. Other improvements include a smaller ejection port, more ergonomic pistol grip, improved rifling and a muzzle brake with a 22 mm threading that can fire NATO-standard rifle grenades.

The fully automatic rate of fire of the cancelled prototype model of the AK-12 is around 600–650 rounds per minute. A unique feature of the prototype is its capability to fire at 1,000 rounds per minute on its three-round hyper burst setting.

Final production model based on the AK-400

The final production model of the AK-12 is based on the well-proven AK-400 prototype. A major technical alteration in the AK-400 prototype versus legacy AKs was the free-floating of the barrel from the handguards. On all previous AK rifles, the lower handguard of the rifle was mounted directly on the barrel with a stamped steel handguard retainer. As a result, a force exerted on the handguard affects the zero of the rifle. In the AK-400 prototype, the handguard is attached to the receiver and to a revised more rigid and non-removable gas tube, allowing the barrel to remain relatively isolated and flex and vibrate unrestricted for increased accuracy. The AK-12 is chambered in 5.45×39mm and due to the Russian military requirements, Kalashnikov Concern also offers the rifle in 7.62×39mm cartridge, designated as the AK-15. Short-barrelled versions of the AK-12 and AK-15 are also being worked on, designated as the AK-12K and AK-15K.

With the final production model, it addresses the Russian Army's concerns regarding the issues in fully automatic fire and the cost of the earlier prototype models and is also expected to be much cheaper to build. It also incorporates many of the same improvements developed for the earlier prototype models of the AK-12 but also improves the strength and resilience of some of the components of the rifle.
The distinctive quick detachable muzzle brake features a large expansion chamber, two symmetrical vertical cuts at the forward end of the brake and three non symmetrical positioned vent holes to counteract muzzle rise and climb as well as lateral shift to the right and features a crown-shaped glass breaker at the end. A flat plate near the end of the brake produces a forward thrust when emerging exhaust gases strike its surface, greatly reducing recoil.
The rifle features an ergonomic pistol grip with an internal maintenance kit storage room, a retractable side-folding telescoping 4 position shoulder stock which is adjustable for length of pull and height adjustable buttpad and has storage room for a 3-piece cleaning rod and a free floating handguard with ventilation holes. The dust cover firing modes and safety selector lever is similar to previous AK-type rifles, but has extensions added for making it possible to manipulate the lever with the right hand index finger or left hand thumb. This style of selector lever was and is sold as an aftermarket part outside Russia and is known in the United States as the Krebs-style safety. The front sight is a shrouded post adjustable for elevation in the field. The Warsaw Pact side dovetail rail for mounting optical sights on legacy AKs and other small arms was replaced by a Picatinny rail for mounting sights. The rifle can also be fitted with a quick detachable sound suppressor and a bayonet. To further increase the combat effectiveness of the rifle, it can be equipped with a 40 mm GP-25/GP-34 single-shot underbarrel grenade launcher.

The design of the final production model of the AK-12 shares more in common with the existing AK-74M than its earlier prototype models, but will not be a retrofit to existing assault rifles. Several improvements were made to the AK-12's receiver, such as an improved and far more rigid top cover interface and a new free-floating barrel. The final production model of the AK-12 reportedly outperforms the existing AK-74 by at least the margin requested by the Russian government.

The final production model of the AK-12 has a cyclic rate of fire of around 600–650 rounds per minute. The three-round hyper burst feature from the earlier prototype models was replaced by a traditional two-round burst feature in the final production model. This fire mode was excluded from the rifles delivered in 2023 which also featured some other minor modifications.

Variants

AK-12 

The final production model of the AK-12 is based on the AK-400 prototype model, which is said to be more reliable, more accurate and better suited to the latest Russian military requirements. It features a Picatinny rail on the top of the receiver for mounting various optical sights and on the top, bottom and sides of the handguard to mount various accessories. The new box magazines are backwards compatible with 5.45×39mm magazines and feature a slant angle on the bottom rear portion to provide a more rigid and stable contact with the ground when the gun is rested on the magazine. It also features witness windows at the 10, 15, 20, 25 and 30 rounds positions to indicate the current loaded amount of rounds. The witness windows numbering indicate the position of the follower inside the magazine. The follower has glow in the dark paint applied to both sides that can be viewed through the witness windows during low light conditions. When the new box magazine is fully loaded, a pin protrudes on the baseplate providing a possibility of a visual and tactile identification of a fully loaded magazine in the pouch. The AK-12 is also compatible with preceding 5.45×39mm box magazines from the AK-74, RPK-74, and the 95-round drum magazine from the RPK-16.

An updated AK-12 was revealed during the ARMY-2020 exhibition. The updates are no major redesign, but centred around ergonomic improvements such as a lightweight polymer L-shaped side-folding telescoping 6 position shoulder stock which is adjustable for length of pull, ergonomic polymer pistol grip and trigger guard unit, and updated rotary diopter rear sight.

During the ARMY-2021 exhibition, an optional cheek riser (a to ergonomic preferences and sight axis height adjustable comb piece) was shown on the shoulder stock. Also shown were standard length barrelled AK-12SP and short-barrelled AK-12SPK variants developed for Russian special forces use. The AK-12SP features lower and upper aluminium upper handguard/gas tube covers with M-LOK slots for direct accessory attachment onto the "negative space" (hollow slot) mounting points. The short-barrelled AK-12SPK features an AK-12 pattern lower handguard with an aluminium upper handguard/gas tube cover that has M-LOK slots.

AK-12K 
During the ARMY-2017 exhibition, Kalashnikov Concern displayed prototypes of the AK-12K, which is a short-barrelled variant of the AK-12.

AK-15

The AK-15 is a variant of the AK-12 chambered in 7.62×39mm. Both the AK-12 and AK-15 have been developed by the Kalashnikov Group under the "Ratnik" program and have been accepted into Russian military service. The only difference between the AK-12 and the AK-15 is their calibre.

AK-15K 
During the ARMY-2017 exhibition, Kalashnikov Concern displayed prototypes of the AK-15K, which is a short-barrelled variant of the AK-15.

AK-19 

Revealed during the International Military-Technical Forum ARMY-2020 exhibition, the AK-19 is a variant of the AK-12 chambered in 5.56×45mm NATO upon the request of potential international clients. It was later unveiled to the public during the IDEX 2021. Like the updated AK-12, that was also revealed during the ARMY-2020 exhibition, the AK-19 features a redesigned polymer L-shaped stock, a redesigned pistol grip and trigger guard, and a new rotary dioptre rear sight. The AK-19 also features a birdcage-type flash suppressor that features slots for a quick detachable sound suppressor.

AK-308 

The AK-308 is a battle rifle under development in 2018 upon request of potential international clients outside Russia. It is based on the AK-12's design and is chambered in 7.62×51mm NATO (.308 Winchester). The basic Kalashnikov assault rifle design which is intended for intermediate calibres has been stretched and strengthened to handle the extra bolt thrust produced by a full-power ammunition. In addition, the AK-308 uses a dioptre sight line. It has the ability to attach accessories also used by the AK-12.

Derivatives

AK-200 rifle family 

The development of the AK-200 rifle family was stopped around 2011 but resumed around 2016. The AK-200 series are somewhat heavier and less advanced compared to the AK-12 series, but also cheaper. As of 2018, 200-series Kalashnikov assault rifles, which include a complete family, are offered for export sales and for domestic law enforcement users. The AK-200 series of rifles are based on the AK-100 rifle series and the AK-12. They can be chambered in 5.45×39mm, 5.56×45mm NATO and 7.62×39mm, and use a barrel and gas system assembly and iron sights line similar to that of the AK-74M/AK-100 rifle family. AK-12 alike improvements added include Picatinny rails, a new pistol grip, a new adjustable buttstock and a new flash hider. They feed from 30-round magazines, and can be compatible with drum magazines from the RPK and RPK-74.

The models are designated, as follows:

AK-200 series assault rifles are supplied to government customers in Russia and are also ready to be exported. Russia and India on March 3, 2019, inaugurated a plant that will produce AK-203 assault rifles.

RPK-16
The RPK-16 squad automatic weapon (the number 16 indicates the year 2016, when the development first started) is Kalashnikov's response to the "Tokar-2" program, where it competed against Degtyaryov's submission. In 2018, the Ministry of Defence of the Russian Federation have signed a contract concerning the procurement of the RPK-16, and is expected to take over the role of the RPK-74 in the Russian Armed Forces.

The RPK-16 is chambered in 5.45×39mm which features the traditional Kalashnikov gas-operated long-stroke piston system, and shares several novel technical and ergonomic features derived from the AK-12 program. Its design enables it to have an interchangeable barrels that can easily be removed, and the ability to quickly attach a detachable suppressor. It primarily uses a 95-round drum magazine and is backwards compatible with box magazines from the AK-74 and RPK-74.

After receiving feedback on the performance of the weapon, the Kalashnikov Concern has begun development on the RPL-20 (20 indicating 2020) belt-fed light machine gun also chambered in 5.45×39mm and with a very similar rate of fire. Kalashnikov Concern has so far created at least one functional prototype. If adopted, the gun will become the first light machine gun to be used by Russian forces since the RPD that isn't magazine-fed or of the standard Kalashnikov pattern.

Gallery

Users 

: In August 2018, at the Army-2018 defence exhibition signed an agreement to produce AK-12 and AK-15 assault rifles, in 2019 they had 50 rifles for testing. In 2021, Armenian Special Forces are seen using AK-12 rifles in a military training exercise.
: In August 2021, at the Army-2021 defence exhibition it was revealed that it has acquired the weapons.
: AK-12 rifles in service with Qatari Emiri Forces shown on parade in December 2018.
: The AK-12 (official GRAU designation 6P70), based on the AK-400 prototype, alongside AK-15 (6P71), were accepted into service in January 2018. The first deliveries of 2,500 AK-12 assault rifles as part of the state defence order began in December 2018. The Russian Ministry of Defence has signed a three-year contract with the Kalashnikov Concern for 150,000 AK-12 and AK-15 assault rifles to be delivered in 2019, 2020 and 2021. According to the Kalashnikov Concern on 20 August 2020 the Russian Defence Ministry is the main customer of the AK-12, which will gradually replace the AK-74M in the army and it is also being exported to some unspecified countries from near abroad. 37,600 were delivered in 2020. A new contract was signed in August 2021 and tens of thousands of rifles were reportedly produced during the year. Russian Airborne Troops units are receiving the AK-12 on a priority basis to gain operational experience with the rifle and various accessories and received about 10,000 as of mid-2020. Russian Airborne Troops armed with AK-12 assault rifles equipped with various accessories were shown at the 9 May 2019 Moscow Victory Day Parade. The AK-12 has also entered service with the military subdivisions of the National Guard of Russia. The Kalashnikov Concern and Russia's Defence Ministry have signed a contract in February 2018 on the delivery of the newest RPK-16 squad automatic weapon. Based on the results of the pilot operation and combat use begun developing a new light machine gun.
: Unknown amount captured during 2022 Russian invasion of Ukraine. Limited usage by Territorial Defense Forces. Unknown amount were also acquired by separatists from Russia.
: A small quantity of AK-12s reportedly announced for purchase on February 2021.

Potential users 

 : In January 2022, Directorate General of Defence Purchase floated a tender for 2,000 AK-15s for the Bangladesh Army.

See also
 FB Beryl
 AK-74MR UUK
 IWI ACE

References

External links

 AK-12 Kalashnikov Technical data sheet - specifications - pictures and video
 Putin praises new Kalashnikov assault rifle—Voice of Russia
 Modern Firearms – Kalashnikov 5.45 mm AK-12 and 7.62 mm AK-15 Assault Rifle
 Kalashnikov Concern discontinues the old AK-12 (Prototype Variants) and replaced them with new a AK-12 (Final Production Variants)
https://www.army-technology.com/news/kalashnikov-ak-12-rifles-russia/

5.45×39mm assault rifles
7.62×39mm assault rifles
AK-012
Assault rifles of Russia
Firearms articles needing expert attention
Kalashnikov Concern products
Military equipment introduced in the 2010s
Post–Cold War weapons of Russia